Siah Cheshmeh (also Romanized as Sīāh Cheshmeh, Seyah Cheshmah, Siāh Chashmeh, and Sīyah Cheshmeh; also known as ( or Kara Aineh.) is a city in the Central District of Chaldoran County, West Azerbaijan province, Iran, and serves as capital of the county. At the 2006 census, its population was 14,189 in 3,024 households. The following census in 2011 counted 15,786 people in 3,733 households. The latest census in 2016 showed a population of 17,804 people in 4,608 households.

References 

Chaldoran County

Cities in West Azerbaijan Province

Populated places in West Azerbaijan Province

Populated places in Chaldoran County